Bowen Southwell (23 March 1713 – 1796) was an Irish politician.

He was the third son of William Southwell and his wife Lucy Bowen, daughter of William Bowen. His uncles were Thomas Southwell, 1st Baron Southwell and Richard Southwell. Southwell entered the Irish House of Commons for Downpatrick in 1755, representing the constituency until 1760.

After the death of his brother Edward in 1736, he inherited his family's estates in Ireland. In July 1753, he married Lady Elizabeth Cornwallis, oldest daughter of Charles Cornwallis, 1st Earl Cornwallis.

References

1713 births
1796 deaths
Irish MPs 1727–1760
Members of the Parliament of Ireland (pre-1801) for County Down constituencies